Mohammed Akaro Mainoma  is a professor of  Accounting and Finance from University of Abuja. He is the immediate past Vice Chancellor of Nasarawa State University, Keffi, Nassarawa.
He is recently appointed as the President of the Association of National Accountants of Nigeria.

Early life and education 
Mainoma was born on September 26, 1965. He started his education at Dunama Primary School, Lafia, and attended Government Secondary School, Miango. He went to Ahmadu Bello University Zaria, Southern University Baton Rouge, University of Pittsburgh and University College Cork, Ireland. He holds B.Sc. Accounting, M.Sc. Accounting and Finance, Masters in Public Sector Accounting, from Nasarawa State University, Keffi, and Ph.D. in finance from the University of Abuja. He also holds an  M.Sc. Accounting and Finance and Ph.D. from the Nigerian Defence Academy.

Career 
In 1990, he worked at Niger State Supply Company Ltd. He also worked with the NCR (NIG) PLC as a Planning Executive. Then in 1992, he join Ahmadu Bello University, Zaria.

Membership and fellowship 
He is a member of The Academy of Management Nigeria (TAMN). He is also a member Nigerian Institute of Management (NIM), Nigerian Economic Society (NES). He is a fellow of Association of National Accountants of Nigeria (ANAN) and Chartered Institute of Taxation of Nigeria (CITN). He lectured at Ahmadu Bello University, Zaria. He served as  Commissioner for Finance, Nasarawa State between 2011 and 2013.
He was the President of the Nigerian Accounting Association (2002–2012). He is a President of the Institute of Financial and Investment Analysts (IFIAN). He was a council member of the Nigerian Accounting Standard Board (NASB) (now the Financial Reporting Council of Nigeria). He is a Member of the Nasarawa State Governing Council representing Senate, the Governing Council of Association of National Accountants of Nigeria (ANAN) and Chartered Institute of Taxation of Nigeria (CITN). He is a member of ICT University Balori Rouge USA and International Association of Accounting Educators and Researchers.

References

1965 births
Living people
Ahmadu Bello University alumni
University of Pittsburgh alumni
Academic staff of the University of Abuja
Academic staff of Ahmadu Bello University
Nigerian civil servants
+Accountants
Academic staff of Nasarawa State University